Burkhard Ziese (1 February 1944 – 19 April 2010) was a German football manager.

Ziese managed Malawi during the 2008 Africa Cup of Nations qualifying round. In 2006, while managing Malawi, Ziese was brutally attacked by four security officials at the apparent direction of the general secretary of the Football Association of Malawi. He work a time for NATO in Brussels and play 1968 by Tongerse SV Cercle three games and scored two goals in fourth division of Belgium.

References 

1944 births
2010 deaths
German football managers
Expatriate football managers in Thailand
Thailand national football team managers
Expatriate football managers in Pakistan
Pakistan national football team managers
Expatriate football managers in Zambia
Zambia national football team managers
Expatriate football managers in Malawi
Malawi national football team managers
Expatriate football managers in Sudan
Sudan national football team managers
Expatriate football managers in Ghana
Ghana national football team managers
Expatriate football managers in Bermuda
Bermuda national football team managers
1998 African Cup of Nations managers
German expatriate football managers
West German expatriate sportspeople in Thailand
West German expatriate sportspeople in Pakistan
German expatriate sportspeople in Zambia
German expatriate sportspeople in Malawi
West German expatriate sportspeople in Sudan
German expatriate sportspeople in Ghana
German expatriate sportspeople in Bermuda
West German football managers
West German expatriate football managers